Ferras is the second extended play by American recording artist Ferras. It was released on June 17, 2014 in the United States and Canada through Capitol Records and Metamorphosis Music. The album follows the release of his debut album Aliens & Rainbows (2008) which reached 97 on the Billboard 200. The extended play is the first to be released by Unsub Records, a record label founded by Katy Perry in 2014.

Track listing

Source:

References

2014 EPs
Capitol Records EPs